Meydan (also Romanized as Meydān; also known as Meydān-e Mīsh Khāş) is a village in Mishkhas Rural District, in the Sivan District of Ilam County, Ilam Province, Iran. At the 2006 census, its population was 869, in 172 families. The village became the capital of Mishkhas Rural District after the creation of Sivan District and the assignment of Jafarabad, the previous capital of the rural district as the capital of the newly created district on March 9, 2013. The village is populated by Kurds.

References 

Populated places in Ilam County
Kurdish settlements in Ilam Province